Copris remotus is a species of dung beetle in the family Scarabaeidae.

Subspecies
These two subspecies belong to the species Copris remotus:
 Copris remotus dicyrtus Matthews and Halffter, 1959 i c g
 Copris remotus remotus LeConte, 1866 i g
Data sources: i = ITIS, c = Catalogue of Life, g = GBIF, b = Bugguide.net

References

Further reading

External links

 

Coprini
Articles created by Qbugbot
Beetles described in 1866